

See also
 List of United States Air Force squadrons

Field investigative